Mulli may refer to:

Places
 Mulli, Peru (Cerro Molle); a mountain 
 Mulli, Tunisia (episcopal bishopric titular see diocese) see Catholic Church in Tunisia
 Mulli, Palakkad District, Kerala, India; a hill station, see List of hill stations in India

People
 Charles Mulli (born 1949), Kenyan entrepreneur
 Henry Nzioka Mulli (1927-2015), Kenyan diplomat
 Ueli Mülli, Swiss curler

See also

 Mullis (surname)
 Molle (disambiguation)